Conus tourosensis is a species of sea snail, a marine gastropod mollusk in the family Conidae, the cone snails, cone shells or cones.

These snails are predatory and venomous. They are capable of "stinging" humans.

Description

Distribution
This marine species of cone snail occurs off the coast of Rio Grande do Norte, Brazil.

References

 Petuch E.J. & Berschauer D.P. (2018). Ten new cone shells from Indonesia, the Marquesas Islands, Brazil, and Pacific Panama. The Festivus. 50(1): 17–35.

tourosensis
Gastropods described in 2018
Molluscs of Brazil